Guarna is an Italian surname. Notable people with the surname include:

Enrico Guarna (born 1985), Italian footballer
Rebecca de Guarna, 13th-century Italian physician, surgeon and writer
Romuald Guarna, 12th-century Roman Catholic archbishop

Italian-language surnames